Palmares do Sul is a municipality in the state of Rio Grande do Sul, Brazil.

See also
List of municipalities in Rio Grande do Sul

References

Populated coastal places in Rio Grande do Sul
Municipalities in Rio Grande do Sul